Collogenes is a genus of moths belonging to the subfamily Olethreutinae of the family Tortricidae.

Species
Collogenes albocingulata Horak, 2006
Collogenes dascia (Bradley, 1962)
Collogenes loricata (Diakonoff, 1959)
Collogenes percnophylla Meyrick, 1931
Collogenes plumbosa Diakonoff, 1959
Collogenes pseuta Diakonoff, 1959
Collogenes squamosa (Diakonoff, 1959)

See also
List of Tortricidae genera

References

External links
tortricidae.com

Tortricidae genera
Taxa named by Edward Meyrick
Olethreutinae